UbiCare provides a platform for researchers and health care providers to deliver important health information to patients via social media.  One article dubs them “the first healthcare content marketplace” with a business model loosely based on Apple's App Store but focused in the healthcare industry.

The company uses evidence-based content and a platform for care providers to interact with social media users.  As of 2011, more than 700 hospitals had already started using Facebook and web services. As more and more people use social media as their news source, companies that convey verified content such as UbiCare will be important for people to receive accurate information.

Most notably, this company enables the public to receive credible health information through social networks. Health topics they cover include: Autism, Cancer, Diabetes, Heart Disease, and Obesity. In May 2017, UbiCare and Truven Health became partners.

See also
 Health care
 Health economics
 Social media measurement
 Participatory media

References

Companies based in Boston
Companies established in 2011
Health care companies based in Massachusetts
Healthcare software companies